Wang Shijing (pinyin: Wāng Shíjǐng; Wade-Giles: Wang Shih-ching) (1887 - August 12, 1952) was a politician and banker in the Republic of China. He was an important politician during the Provisional Government of the Republic of China and the Wang Jingwei regime (Republic of China-Nanjing). He was born in Jingde, Anhui.

Biography 
Wang Shijing went to Japan where he graduated the Military Account School (:ja:陸軍経理学校). Later he returned to China, he entered to the Beijing Government, and became a secretary to the Minister for Finance Wang Kemin and Zhang Gu. Wang Shijing also held the position of Head of the Factory of Clothing. In July 1927 he was appointed a member of the City Management Commission of Wuhan and Vice-Manager to the Hankou Branch of the Bank of China. Later he was promoted to be Manager to the Shenyang Branch of the Bank of China.

In December 1937 Wang Kemin established the Provisional Government of the Republic of China, Wang Shijing also participated in it. In March 1938 Wang Shijing was appointed Governor of the United Reserve Bank of China (:ja:中国聯合準備銀行) and member of the Japan-China Economical Conference. In March 1940 the Wang Jingwei regime was established, Wang Shijing was appointed Executive Member and Governor to the General Office for Finance of the North China Political Council. Later he successively held the positions of Executive Member of the Commission for National Economy, Governor of the General Office for Economy of the North China Political Council, etc.

In September 1944 he went to Japan as representative of the North China Political Council, and visited Wang Jingwei in hospital. He also signed an agreement for 3 hundred million yen loan from the Bank of Japan.

After Wang Jinwei regime had collapsed, Wang Shijing was arrested by Chiang Kai-shek's National Government at Beiping on December 5, 1945. He was sent to Nanjing. In next October 15 because of the charge of the treason and surrender to enemy (namely Hanjian), he was sentenced to life imprisonment on the Capital High Court. In January 1949 he was sent to the prison in Shanghai. After the People's Republic of China had established, his treatment wasn't changed.

Wang Shijing died in prison on August 12, 1952.

Alma mater 

Army Accounting School (Japan)

References

Footnotes 
 
 
  History of Prison in Shanghai The Office of Shanghai’s　History (上海地方志办公室) Website
 
 

1887 births
1952 deaths
Politicians from Xuancheng
Republic of China politicians from Anhui
Chinese collaborators with Imperial Japan
Prisoners sentenced to life imprisonment by China
Prisoners who died in Chinese detention